Brian D. McLaren (born 1956) is an American pastor, author, speaker, and leading figure in the emerging church movement. McLaren is also associated with postmodern Christianity.

Education and career
Raised in Rockville, Maryland in the conservative Open Brethren, part of the Plymouth Brethren, McLaren became attracted to the countercultural Jesus Movement in the 1970s.  In the 1970s and early 1980s, McLaren attended the University of Maryland where he received both a B.A. and M.A.  He founded Cedar Ridge Community Church in Spencerville, Maryland, in 1982 while he was teaching English on the college level. In 1986, he became a full-time pastor. The church eventually grew to include 500 members. In 2015, McLaren was recognized by Time magazine as one of the 25 Most Influential Evangelicals in America. McLaren left his position at Cedar Ridge in 2006 to pursue writing and speaking full time.

In 2011, McLaren defended Rob Bell's controversial book Love Wins against critiques from figures such as Albert Mohler, who argued that Bell advocated universalism. 

In 2013, McLaren stated that he did not believe homosexual conduct to be sinful.

Personal life

McLaren is married and has four children. In September 2012, McLaren led a commitment ceremony for his son Trevor and partner Owen Ryan at the Audubon Naturalist Society in Chevy Chase, Maryland.

Bibliography
 The Church on the Other Side: Doing Ministry in the Postmodern Matrix (originally published as Reinventing Your Church, Zondervan, March 1998 )
 Finding Faith: A Self-Discovery Guide for Your Spiritual Quest (Zondervan, June 1999)
 A New Kind of Christian: A Tale of Two Friends on a Spiritual Journey (Jossey-Bass, January 2001)
 More Ready Than You Realize: Evangelism as Dance in the Postmodern Matrix (Zondervan, January 2002)
 A Is for Abductive: The Language of the Emerging Church (co-written with Leonard Sweet and Jerry Haselmayer, Zondervan, December 2002)
 Adventures in Missing the Point: How the Culture-Controlled Church Neutered the Gospel (co-written with Tony Campolo, Emergent/YS, March 2003)
 The Church in Emerging Culture: Five Perspectives (Zondervan Emergent/YS, October 2003 ) Leonard Sweet (General Editor), with contributors Andy Crouch, Brian D. McLaren, Erwin McManus, Michael Horton, Frederica Mathewes-Green
 The Story We Find Ourselves In: Further Adventures of a New Kind of Christian (Jossey-Bass, February 2003)
 A Generous Orthodoxy: Why I Am a Missional, Evangelical, Post/Protestant, Liberal/Conservative, Mystical/Poetic, Biblical, Charismatic/Contemplative, Fundamentalist/Calvinist, Anabaptist/Anglican, Methodist, Catholic, Green, Incarnational, Depressed-yet-Hopeful, Emergent, Unfinished CHRISTIAN (Zondervan, September 2004)
 The Last Word and the Word After That: A Tale of Faith, Doubt, and a New Kind of Christianity (Jossey-Bass, April 2005)
 The Secret Message of Jesus: Uncovering the Truth that Could Change Everything (W Publishing Group, April 2006)
 The Voice of Luke: Not Even Sandals (Thomas Nelson, July 2007) 
 Everything Must Change: Jesus, Global Crises, and a Revolution of Hope (Thomas Nelson, October 2007) 
 Finding Our Way Again: The Return of the Ancient Practices (Thomas Nelson, May 2008) 
 The Justice Project (Baker, September 2009), edited with Elisa Padilla, and Ashley Bunting Seeber 
 A New Kind of Christianity (HarperOne, February 2010) 
 Naked Spirituality: A Life With God in 12 Simple Words (HarperOne, March 2011) 
 Why Did Jesus, Moses, the Buddha, and Mohammed Cross the Road? Christian Identity in a Multi-Faith World (Jericho Books, September 2012) 
 We Make the Road by Walking: A Year-Long Quest for Spiritual Formation, Reorientation, and Activation (Jericho Books, June 2014) 
 The Great Spiritual Migration: How the World's Largest Religion Is Seeking a Better Way to Be Christian (Convergent Books, September 2017)
Seeking Aliveness: Daily Reflections on a New Way to Experience and Practise the Christian Faith (Hodder & Stoughton, October 2017)
The Galápagos Islands: A Spiritual Journey (Broadleaf Press, October 2019)
Faith After Doubt: Why Your Beliefs Stopped Working and What to Do About It (St. Martin's Press, January 2021)
Do I Stay Christian?: A Guide for the Doubters, the Disappointed, and the Disillusioned (St. Martin's Press, May 2022, ISBN 9781250262790)

See also

References

Critical references
 Carson, D. A. Becoming Conversant with the Emerging Church. Grand Rapids, Michigan Zondervan, 2005.
 Erickson, Millard. Postmodernizing the Faith: Evangelical Responses to the Challenge of Postmodernism. Grand Rapids, Michigan: Baker Books, 1998.
 ; Helseth, Paul Kjoss; and Taylor, Justin eds. Reclaiming the Center: Confronting Evangelical Accommodation in Postmodern Times. Wheaton, Illinois: Crossway Books, 2004.
 Smith, R. Scott. Truth and the New Kind of Christian: The Emerging Effects of Postmodernism in the Church. Wheaton, Illinois: Crossway Books, 2005.

External links
 
 "Evangelical Author Puts Progressive Spin On Traditional Faith"  (Washington Post, September 10, 2006)
 Video interview/discussion with Richard Land on Bloggingheads.tv

Interviews
 Interview with Brian McLaren on "Finding Our Way Again" by ReadTheSpirit.com
 Interview with Brian McLaren on "A New Kind of Christianity" by ReadTheSpirit.com

1956 births
Living people
American evangelists
Emerging church movement
American Christian religious leaders
21st-century Protestant religious leaders
Christian radicals
Christian bloggers